Robert David "Bob" Hamman (born August 6, 1938 in Pasadena, California) is an American professional bridge player, among the greatest players of all time. He is from Dallas, Texas.

Hamman and Bobby Wolff played as partners for nearly three decades on teams that challenged for major trophies in North America and often for world championships. Representing the United States (from about 1980, previously North America) they won eight world championships for national teams, the 1988 World Team Olympiad and seven Bermuda Bowls spanning 1970 to 1995. For the last they were members of Nick Nickell's professional team, where Hamman remained a fixture through the current two-year cycle and won three more Bermuda Bowls in partnership with Paul Soloway and Zia Mahmood.

Beginning 2012/2013,
Nickell has replaced Bobby Hamman and Zia Mahmood with Bobby Levin–Steve Weinstein.
A new pairing for Hamman with Bart Bramley was announced in July but never secured, according to a November report that Hamman will play with Justin Lall. Justin was a silver medalist in the 2011 Bermuda Bowl and is the son of Hemant Lall, Hamman's partner in 2007.

Bridge career
Hamman first qualified for a world championship in the open category by winning the American Contract Bridge League international trials in 1963, for the 1964 World Team Olympiad. That was a "pairs trial" from which the winning pair and two of the three runners-up would be selected as a 6-person team.

Dallas businessman Ira Corn established the first full-time professional team in 1968, the Dallas Aces, later simply Aces. Hamman joined in 1969, as the sixth player, and established a partnership with Billy Eisenberg. Following the retirement of Italy's Blue team, they won the 1970 Bermuda Bowl as North America representative and repeated in 1971 as defending champion. He has won 12 world championships and 50 North American championships. Hamman and Brent Manley wrote his autobiography At the Table: My Life and Times, published in 1994. He was inducted into the ACBL Hall of Fame in 1999; a version of his citation that reports 23,219 s to March 2001 also reads:

"One of the world's greatest players, ranks #1 among WBF [World Bridge Federation] Grand Masters, also ranks 1st in world performance over past 10 years. Member ACBL Hall of Fame. Has been highest ranked player in the world since 1985."

Hamman's most unusual accomplishment may be eight wins in the ACBL's most important pair championships (Blue Ribbon Pairs, Life Master Pairs and Men's Pairs) with eight different partners. He won the World Open Pairs once, with Bobby Wolff in 1974, and he was second in 1994 with Michael Rosenberg.

Probably his most popular and emotional win, other than the 1970 Bermuda Bowl, was the annual Vanderbilt Trophy, the oldest open teams event in North America, in 2000. Despite myriad other wins, Hamman had not won the Vanderbilt since 1973. His partner Paul Soloway was severely ill, commuting between the tournament site and the hospital, and literally came out of his sickbed to play the final quarter of the quarterfinal match; they won that session by 34 IMPs to win the match by 1.  On the final board, Hamman and Soloway had a bidding misunderstanding to reach a very poor 6H contract, but their opponents could not work out declarer's hand due to the unusual auction, and the contract made, providing the margin of victory.

Hamman's Law is the maxim, "If you have a choice of reasonable bids and one of them is 3NT, then bid it."

Prize coverage business
Hamman founded SCA Promotions in 1986.  The company offers a form of insurance where they cover the prize money for large competitions, initially focusing on hole-in-one prizes in golf. In 2015, SCA was able to retrieve money from Lance Armstrong that had been paid to cover prize money.

He was portrayed by Dustin Hoffman in the 2015 film The Program, dealing with Lance Armstrong's career and downfall.

Bridge accomplishments

Honors
 ACBL Hall of Fame, 1999
 ACBL Honorary Member of the Year 1991

Awards
 ACBL Player of the Year 1990, 1993, 2006
 Fishbein Trophy 1969, 1983
 Herman Trophy 1978, 1988, 1993
 Precision Award (Best Defended Hand of the Year) 1986, 1993

Wins
 Bermuda Bowl (10) 1970, 1971, 1977, 1983, 1985, 1987, 1995, 2000, 2003, 2009
 World Open Team Olympiad (1) 1988
 World Open Pairs (1) 1974
 North American Bridge Championships (54)
 Vanderbilt (6) 1964, 1966, 1971, 1973, 2000, 2003
 Spingold (15) 1969, 1979, 1982, 1983, 1989, 1990, 1993, 1994, 1995, 1996, 1998, 1999, 2004, 2006, 2007
 Chicago (now Reisinger) (1) 1962
 Reisinger (11) 1970, 1978, 1979, 1988, 1993, 1994, 1995, 2004, 2005, 2008, 2009
 Grand National Teams (4) 1975, 1977, 1986, 2006
 Open Board-a-Match Teams (2) 2008, 2019
 Men's Board-a-Match Teams (1) 1988
 Jacoby Open Swiss Teams (3) 1990, 2006, 2009
 Master Mixed Teams (1) 1987
 Blue Ribbon Pairs (4) 1964, 1986, 1991, 1993
 Life Master Pairs (3) 1980, 1983, 1992
 Platinum Pairs (1) 2012
 Senior Knockout Teams (1) (2016)
 Men's Pairs (1) 1986
 United States Bridge Championships (18)
 Open Team Trials (17) 1969, 1971, 1973, 1977, 1979 (Dec), 1982, 1984, 1985, 1987, 1988, 1992, 1998, 2001, 2002, 2004, 2007, 2008, 2012
 Open Pair Trials (1) 1963
 Other notable wins:
 Buffett Cup (1) 2006
 Cavendish Invitational Pairs (1) 1998

Runners-up
 Bermuda Bowl (6) 1966, 1973, 1974, 1975, 1997, 2005
 World Open Team Olympiad (4) 1964, 1972, 1980, 1992
 World Open Pairs (1) 1994
 World Mixed Pairs (2) 1986, 1994
 North American Bridge Championships (19)
 Vanderbilt (5) 1968, 1970, 1981, 1996, 2002
 Spingold (1) 1970
 Reisinger (1) 1968
 Open Board-a-Match Teams (2) 1998, 1999
 Men's Board-a-Match Teams (4) 1969, 1980, 1984, 1989
 Jacoby Open Swiss Teams (1) 1992
 Life Master Men's Pairs (2) 1980, 1981
 Open Pairs (1) 1988
 Open Pairs I (1) 1999
 Men's Pairs (1) 1985
 United States Bridge Championships (3)
 Open Team Trials (2) 1979 (Jan), 1997
 Open Pair Trials (1) 1965
 Other notable 2nd places:
 Buffett Cup (1) 2008
 Forbo-Krommenie Nations Cup (1) 1997
 Cavendish Invitational Teams (1) 1997
 Sunday Times–Macallan Invitational Pairs (1) 1992
 Pamp World Par Contest (1) 1990

Publications

Notes

References

Further reading

External links
  – with video interviews
 
 
 Bob Hamman at Bridge Winners 
  

1938 births
American contract bridge players
Bermuda Bowl players
Contract bridge writers
Living people
People from Pasadena, California
People from Dallas